Mount Scott Alternative High School is an alternative high school in Portland, Oregon.  It is designed to provide a semi-traditional learning environment for high school students with the added benefit of small classes and supportive adults.  The school enrolls 160 students with an average teacher-to-student ratio of 1 to 15.  Thematic, integrated courses are offered in languages, arts, math, social studies, science, health and P.E., plus a variety of electives.  Students participate in service learning activities, as well as outdoor educational experiences. The school employs a full-time counselor and counseling interns, and provides individual tutoring services through a variety of volunteers. The school is located in the former Laurelwood United Methodist Church, near the corner of Foster and Holgate in south-east Portland.

References

External links 
 Official Site

References 

High schools in Portland, Oregon
Alternative schools in Oregon
Private high schools in Oregon